Javed, Javaid, Javid, Jawed or Jawaid Iqbal may refer to:

 Justice Javed Iqbal (judge, born 1924) (1924-2015), former Chief Justice Lahore High Court
 Justice Javed Iqbal (judge, born 1946), former Chief Justice High Court of Balochistan
 Javed Iqbal (serial killer) (1956-2001), Pakistani serial killer
 Jawed Iqbal (cartoonist), Pakistani cartoonist
 Jawaid Iqbal (born 1972), Pakistan-born Hong Kong cricketer
 Javaid Iqbal (cable television installer), Pakistani immigrant to the United States, respondent in U.S. Supreme Court case, Ashcroft v. Iqbal
 Javed Iqbal (satellite television installer), Pakistani immigrant to the United States, convicted for providing access to Al-Manar channel to customers
 Javed Iqbal Ramday President of the National Defence University (NDU), Islamabad
 Javid Iqbal, a pseudonym used by British actor Shazad Latif
 Javed Iqbal (admiral) (born 1942), Pakistan Navy, politician, and diplomat

See also
 Jawed (disambiguation)
 Iqbal (disambiguation)